The Slauerhoffbrug is a fully automatic bascule bridge (aka tail bridge) in the city of Leeuwarden in the Netherlands. It is a road bridge that carries the Slauerhoffweg (named after J. Slauerhoff) over the Harlingervaart. It was completed in 2000. 

The bridge uses two arms to swing a section of road in and out of place. The deck is 15 m by 15 m. It is painted in yellow and blue, representative of Leeuwarden's flag and seal. This movable bridge is also known as the  “Slauerhoffbrug ‘Flying’ Drawbridge”. One of the main designers is Emile Asari. A tail bridge can quickly and efficiently be raised and lowered from one pylon (instead of hinges). This quickly allows water traffic to pass while only briefly blocking road traffic.

References

External links

 Popular Mechanics article on the Slauerhoff bridge
 4 Photos by Van Driel of the bridge up from different angles
 3 Photos of bridge up
 1 Photo of bridge up from road
 Slauerhoffbrug opening and closing
 timelapse of the bridge in action

Bascule bridges
Bridges completed in 2000
Road bridges in the Netherlands
Steel bridges in the Netherlands
Bridges in Friesland
Buildings and structures in Leeuwarden
Transport in Leeuwarden